Aart Jan de Geus (born 28 July 1955) is a retired Dutch politician of the Christian Democratic Appeal (CDA) party and businessman. He served as Minister of Labor and Social Affairs from 2002 to 2007. Then he worked as Deputy Secretary-General for the OECD. From 2012 to 2019, De Geus was Chairman and CEO of the Bertelsmann Stiftung. Since January 2020, he has been Chairman of the Goldschmeding Foundation.

Education 
De Geus began studying law at the Utrecht University while also training as a bookkeeper. He ended his training after two years in order to concentrate exclusively on his studies. He later transferred to Erasmus University Rotterdam, where the law program had a more practical orientation. After receiving his Master of Laws in 1980, he did post-graduate studies in labor law at Radboud University Nijmegen.

Career 
In 1980, de Geus became a lawyer for the industrial trade union of the Christelijk Nationaal Vakverbond (CNV). In subsequent years he rose through the organization, eventually joining the board of directors. In 1988, he joined the umbrella organization of the CNV confederation and was appointed its deputy chairman in 1993. His responsibilities in this position included social security, pensions, health and employment. He was also a member of the Socioeconomic Advisory Council, the Dutch government’s highest body for economic and social policy issues, one that is anchored in the constitution and whose members are appointed by the crown.

In 1998, De Geus became a partner at the corporate consultancy Boer & Croon in Amsterdam. There he worked on projects relating to the welfare state for both public and private institutions. He also joined the supervisory board of the Academic Hospital of Maastricht, the advisory council of the Association of Dutch Health Insurers, and the Council of Churches where he was responsible for social policy issues. He was also a member of the National Refugees Council.

Public office 
In the mid-1970s, De Geus joined the youth organization of the Dutch ARP (Anti-Revolutionary Party), a predecessor of the CDA. Through the years he held various positions in both parties. In 2002, Jan Peter Balkenende appointed de Geus as minister of social affairs and employment (first Balkenende cabinet). He also served as health minister for eight months. He was a member of the Dutch government until 2007 (second and third Balkenende cabinets).

While in office, de Geus initiated comprehensive social policy reforms with the goal of making the country's social security system more sustainable and including more people in the labor market. For example, he restructured the public- and private-sector job referral systems. He also included local-level governments in the funding structure for social assistance programs. He was considered a supporter of the country's polder model, an approach that brings together employers, trade unions and government experts to negotiate wages and working conditions. Despite his earlier activities for the CNV trade union confederation, his relationship with the country's trade unions proved difficult. In 2004, he withstood a vote of no confidence brought by the opposition Social Democratic, Socialist and Green parties.

In 2007, de Geus was appointed deputy secretary-general of the OECD. In this role he advanced a number of causes including environmentally friendly economic growth. He also criticized the division present in the German job market, above all since it allowed young and well-trained workers to benefit to a greater degree from the country's economic upturn.

Bertelsmann Stiftung 
In 2011, the Bertelsmann Stiftung appointed de Geus to its executive board. In 2012, he became the board's chairman when Gunter Thielen retired. The Bertelsmann Stiftung thus increased its independence from the Mohn family, owners of the Bertelsmann group. As chairman, de Geus launched the initiative to internationalize the foundation's activities. Today, de Geus is responsible for projects relating to Europe, democracy and sustainable economies as well as international megatrends and partnerships.

Other functions 
He is responsible for projects relating to Europe, democracy and sustainable economies as well as international megatrends and partnerships. He previously served as the deputy secretary-general of the Organisation for Economic Co-operation and Development (OECD). From 2002 to 2007, he served under Prime Minister Jan Peter Balkenende in the Netherlands as minister of social affairs and employment. He is a member of the Christian Democratic Appeal (CDA) party.
Since 2012 De Geus has been a member of the advisory board of the Centre for Higher Education (CHE), in which the Bertelsmann Stiftung holds a 90-percent stake. In 2014, he was elected chairman of the supervisory board of the Netherlands-based Triodos Bank, a leading sustainability bank with offices in Belgium, Germany, the UK and Spain.

Publications

Decorations

References

External links

Official
  Mr. A.J. (Aart Jan) de Geus Parlement & Politiek

 

 
 

 
 

1955 births
Living people
Christian Democratic Appeal politicians
Dutch accountants
Dutch chief executives in the finance industry
Dutch corporate directors
Dutch expatriates in France
Dutch expatriates in Germany
Dutch jurists
Dutch lobbyists
Dutch management consultants
Dutch nonprofit directors
Dutch nonprofit executives
Dutch political consultants
Dutch trade union leaders
Erasmus University Rotterdam alumni
Members of the Social and Economic Council
Ministers of Health of the Netherlands
Ministers of Social Affairs of the Netherlands
Ministers of Sport of the Netherlands
Officers of the Order of Orange-Nassau
OECD officials
People from Doorn
Protestant Church Christians from the Netherlands
Reformed Churches Christians from the Netherlands
Radboud University Nijmegen alumni
Utrecht University alumni
20th-century Dutch civil servants
20th-century Dutch politicians
21st-century Dutch businesspeople
21st-century Dutch civil servants
21st-century Dutch politicians